Une époque formidable... is a 1991 French comedy-drama film directed by Gérard Jugnot.

Plot 
Michel Berthier is a qualified employee in a company specialized in sale of mattresses, until he is laid off. Absolutely wanting to have a child with his wife Juliette, who already has two children from her first marriage, he tells nothing, and quickly finds himself in a situation to leave the family home. After a few misadventures, Michel Berthier meets Crayon, Le Toubib and Mimosa, who will become his unfortunate companions among the homelesses.

Cast

References

External links 

1991 films
1990s French-language films
French comedy-drama films
Films shot in Paris
Films directed by Gérard Jugnot
1990s French films